The fjords of Iceland, listed in a clockwise direction round the island from the SW to the east. There are no important fjords along the south coast: most of the inlets there are lagoons.

Western fjords
Faxaflói
 Stakksfjörður
 Hafnarfjörður
 Skerjafjörður
 Kollafjörður
 Hvalfjörður
 Borgarfjörður
 Haffjörður
Breiðafjörður
 Fjords on northern Snæfellsnes and in Dalasýsla ("Dalir"):
 Grundarfjörður
 Kolgrafafjörður
 Hraunsfjörður
 Vigrafjörður
 Álftafjörður
 Hvammsfjörður
 Fjords in Barðaströnd:
 Gilsfjörður
 Króksfjörður
 Berufjörður
 Þorskafjörður
 Djúpifjörður
 Gufufjörður
 Kollafjörður
 Kvígindisfjörður
 Skálmarfjörður
 Vattarfjörður
 Kerlingarfjörður
 Mjóifjörður
 Kjálkafjörður
 Vatnsfjörður

Westfjords
 Patreksfjörður
 Tálknafjörður
 Arnarfjörður
 Suðurfirðir
 Fossfjörður
 Reykjarfjörður
 Trostansfjörður
 Geirþjófsfjörður
 Borgarfjörður
 Dýrafjörður
 Önundarfjörður
 Súgandafjörður
 Ísafjarðardjúp
 Skutulsfjörður
 Álftafjörður
 Seyðisfjörður
 Hestfjörður
 Skötufjörður
 Mjóifjörður
 Vatnsfjörður
 Reykjarfjörður
 Ísafjörður
 Kaldalón
 Jökulfirðir
 Leirufjörður
 Hrafnsfjörður
 Lónafjörður
 Veiðileysufjörður
 Hesteyrarfjörður
 Furufjörður
 Þaralátursfjörður
 Reykjarfjörður nyrðri
 Bjarnarfjörður nyrðri
 Eyvindarfjörður
 Ófeigsfjörður
 Ingólfsfjörður
 Norðurfjörður
 Reykjarfjörður (Ströndum)
 Veiðileysufjörður (Ströndum)

Northwestern region
 Bjarnarfjörður
 Steingrímsfjörður
 Kollafjörður
 Bitrufjörður
 Hrútafjörður
 Miðfjörður
 Húnafjörður
 Skagafjörður
 Siglufjörður
 Héðinsfjörður
 Ólafsfjörður

Northeastern region
 Eyjafjörður
 Þorgeirsfjörður
 Hvalvatnsfjörður
 Skjálfandi
 Öxarfjörður
 Þistilfjörður
 Lónafjörður
 Bakkaflói
 Finnafjörður
 Miðfjörður
 Bakkafjörður
 Vopnafjörður
 Nýpsfjörður
 Héraðsflói

Eastern fjords
 Borgarfjörður Eystri
 Loðmundarfjörður
 Seyðisfjörður
 Mjóifjörður
 Norðfjarðarflói
 Norðfjörður
 Hellisfjörður
 Viðfjörður
 Reyðarfjörður
 Eskifjörður
 Fáskrúðsfjörður
 Stöðvarfjörður
 Berufjörður
 Hamarsfjörður
 Álftafjörður
 Lónsfjörður
 Papafjörður
 Skarðsfjörður
 Hornafjörður

See also

References
 Atlaskort/Hannes H. Hansen (2010). Atlaskort, Forlagið
 Kortasjá Online map at National Land Survey of Iceland

 
Lists of landforms of Iceland
Iceland